Asclepias incarnata, the swamp milkweed, rose milkweed, rose milkflower, swamp silkweed, or white Indian hemp,  is a herbaceous perennial plant species native to North America. It grows in damp through wet soils and also is cultivated as a garden plant for its flowers, which attract butterflies and other pollinators with nectar.  Like most other milkweeds, it has latex containing toxic chemicals, a characteristic that repels insects and other herbivorous animals.

Description
Typically, its stems are branched and the clump forming plants emerge in late spring after most other plants have begun growth for the year.

The plants bloom in early through mid-summer, producing small, fragrant, pink to mauve (sometimes white) colored flowers in rounded umbellate racemes. The flower color varies from darker shades of purple through soft, pinkish purple and a white flowering form exists as well. The actinomorphic flowers have five reflexed petals and an elevated central crown. They then release light or dark brown, flat seeds that are attached to silver-white, silky hairs which catch the wind. This natural mechanism for seed dispersal is similar to that used by other milkweed species.

Taxonomy
, Kew's Plants of the World Online (POWO) accepts 2 infraspecies, each having numerous synonyms:

The flower stalks and abaxial leaf surfaces of subspecies pulchra are abundantly pubescent, whereas those of the autonymous subspecies are nearly glabrous.

Habitat
Swamp milkweed prefers moisture retentive through damp soils in full sun or partial shade and is typically found growing wild near the edges of ponds, lakes, streams, and low areas—or along ditches.  It is one of the best attractors of the monarch butterfly (Danaus plexippus), which feeds on the flowers and lays  eggs on the plants. The emerging caterpillars feed on the leaves.

The plants have specialized roots which function in heavy, wet soils. The scented, thick, white roots are in environments low in oxygen. Blooming occurs in mid- through late summer and after blooming long, relatively thin, rounded follicles are produced that grow uprightly. They split open in late summer through late fall, releasing seeds attached to silky hairs, which act as parachutes that carry the seeds in wind currents.

Cultivation
A. incarnata is cultivated frequently, and a number of cultivars are available.  They are used especially in gardens designed to attract butterflies (see Butterfly gardening).  The nectar of the plant attracts many other species of insect as well. The plants are also sold as freshly cut flowers, mostly for their long-lasting flower display, but sometimes, for the distinctive follicles.

Monarch Watch provides information on rearing monarchs and their host plants. Efforts to increase monarch butterfly populations by establishing butterfly gardens and monarch migratory "waystations" require particular attention to the target species' food preferences and population cycles, as well to the conditions needed to propagate and maintain their food plants.

The seeds of some milkweeds need periods of cold treatment (cold stratification) before they will germinate. To protect seeds from washing away during heavy rains and from seed–eating birds, one can cover the seeds with a light fabric or with an  layer of straw mulch. However, mulch acts as an insulator. Thicker layers of mulch can prevent seeds from germinating if they prevent soil temperatures from rising enough when winter ends. Further, few seedlings can push through a thick layer of mulch.

Breeding monarchs prefer to lay eggs on A. incarnata. The species is therefore often planted in butterfly gardens and "Monarch Waystations" to help sustain monarch butterfly populations. However, A. incarnata is an early successional plant that usually grows at the margins of wetlands and in seasonally flooded areas.

The plant is slow to spread via seeds, does not spread by runners and tends to disappear as vegetative densities increase and habitats dry out. Although A. incarnata plants can survive for up to 20 years, most live only two-five years in gardens. The species is not shade-tolerant and is not a good vegetative competitor.

Images

References

External links

 Asclepias incarnata at Evergreen native plant database.

incarnata
Butterfly food plants
Flora of Eastern Canada
Flora of the Great Lakes region (North America)
Flora of the North-Central United States
Flora of the United States
Flora of the Northeastern United States
Flora of the Southeastern United States
Garden plants of North America
Plants described in 1753
Taxa named by Carl Linnaeus